The Saint Lucia black finch (Melanospiza richardsoni) is a species of bird in the family Thraupidae. It is endemic to Saint Lucia, where its natural habitats are subtropical or tropical moist lowland forest, subtropical or tropical dry shrubland, and plantations. It is threatened by habitat loss.

References

Saint Lucia black finch
Birds of Saint Lucia
Endemic birds of the Caribbean
Endemic fauna of Saint Lucia
Saint Lucia black finch
Saint Lucia black finch
Taxonomy articles created by Polbot
Tanagers